The 2016–17 season was the season of competitive football (soccer) in Senegal.

Diary of the season
US Gorée won the 2015-16 Senegalese Super Cup
US Gorée won the 2015-16 Champion's Trophy
November 5: Both Tenugueth and Jaraaf started off with first place and had three points each, also Tenugueth played their first Ligue 1 match
November 6: Gorée defeated Stade de Mbour 0-1 and is Gorée's only win to date
November 13:
Génération Foot defeated La Linguère 3-4 and became the highest scoring match, it is now second
Diambars made a draw with Mbour Pétite-Côté with a goal and started Diambar's twelve match unbeaten streak
November 14: Casa Sports took the lead with six points
November 22:
Jaraaf retook the lead and had seven points
Niarry Tally defeated Casa Sport 4–0 and was the biggest home win until December 29
November 26: Jaraaf defeated ASEC Ndjambour 5-2 and became the highest scoring match for nearly six months
November 27 - Douanes defeated Guédiawaye 1–4 and is currently the biggest away win
December 14: Match between Casa Sports and Guédiawaye was delayed
December 15: Stade de Mbour took the lead and had ten points
December 23: Génération Foot took the lead and had 14 points
mid-January: All sports competitions including football took a break due to the holy month of Ramadan in the Islamic calendar
February 19: 2016-17 Ligue 1 season continues
March 18: Diambars' 12 match unbeaten streak went to an end after a loss to Jaraaf 2-1
April 1: Ouakam defeated Djambars 2-1 and escaped the relegation zone
April 2: Ndiambour lost to Linguère 2-1 and put inside the relegation zone
May 3: The rescheduled match between Casa Sport and Guédiawaye was to be played, the match was forbidden by local authorities, the match was awarded 0-3 to Guédiawaye
May 7: Génération Foot of Sangalkam reached the 40th point and currently has an eight-point difference over second placed Casa Sport
May 20: Diaraf defeated Casa Sports 6-0 and made became the highest scoring match of the season
late-May: Génération Foot became football champions just a few weeks before the end of the season
June 25: Génération Foot, a club based in Sangalkam located east of Dakar won their only national football championship title
mid-July: Stade de Mbour won their only League Cup title

See also
2016 in Senegal
2017 in Senegal

References

 
2016 in Senegalese sport
2016 in association football
2017 in Senegalese sport
2017 in association football